Joseph Johnson (1776–1862) was the twenty-seventh mayor of Charleston, South Carolina, serving two terms from 1825 to 1827. He was re-elected to his second term on September 4, 1826. He also was the president of the Branch Bank of the United States from 1818 until its close and authored a work titled "Traditions of South Carolina." Johnson died on October 6, 1862, in Pineville, South Carolina and is buried at St. Philips Episcopal Church in Charleston. In his youth he operated the leading drug store in Charleston.

References

Mayors of Charleston, South Carolina
1776 births
1862 deaths
People from Mount Pleasant, South Carolina